Gérard Emmanuel Weil (born 1926 in Strasbourg; died October 1986 in Lyon) was a French Hebraist and biblical scholar.

He was professor at Université Nancy-II and later at Université Lyon-III, where he was the manager of the Centre d'analyse et de traitement automatique de la Bible (CATAB). His research field was the Masoretic Text of the Hebrew Bible.

He has published at :
 CNRS Editions
 Pontifical Biblical Institute
 German Bible Society (as an editor of the Masoretic Text)
 Brill Publishers

Publications (selection) 
Massorah gedolah; Iuxta codicem Leringradensem B19a; elaboravit ediditque Gérard E. Weil; Romae : Pontificium Inst. Biblicum [u.a.], 1971 (Einheitssachtitel: Masora. – Mit Parallelt. in franz. u. hebr. Sprache. – Nebensacht.: Masora magna. – Text hebr., Einleitung franz. u. hebr.).
Biblia Hebraica Stuttgartensia; textum masoreticum curavit H. P. Rüger. Masoram elaboravit G. E. Weil. Editio secunda emendata opera W. Rudolph et H. P. Rüger; Rudolph, W [Hrsg.]; Stuttgart : Deutsche Bibelgesellschaft, 1984.
Elie Lévita; humaniste et massorète (1469–1549); Verf.: Gérard E. Weil; Leiden : Brill, 1963 (Schriftenreihe	Studia post-biblica ; 7; Umfang	XXIII, 428 S.).
Initiation à la Massorah; l'introduction au Séphèr Zikhronōt d' Elie Lévita; Gérard E. Weil; Leiden : Brill, 1964.
Titel	La bibliothèque de Gersonide; d'après son catalogue autographe; Gérard E. Weil; Louvain {[u.a.] : Peeters, 1991 (Schriftenreihe	Collection de la Revue des études juives ; [10]).
Concordance de la cantilation; Weil, Gérard E.; Rivière, P.; Paris : Ed. du CNRS, 1978 (Schriftenreihe	Documentation de la Bible ; 1).

Reference

External links 
 Notice documentaire 

1926 births
1986 deaths
French biblical scholars
French Hebraists